Valentin Altenburg is a German field hockey coach. He coached the German national team at the 2016 Summer Olympics, where the team won the bronze medal.

References

Living people
German field hockey coaches
Place of birth missing (living people)
Year of birth missing (living people)